The Old Clinton Historic District, also known as Old Clinton, is a  historic district in Clinton, Georgia which was listed on the National Register of Historic Places in 1974.
 
It then included 11 contributing buildings and it included Georgian Revival architecture.

Amongst its notable buildings are:
Glower-Gaultney House (c.1816-19), on Madison Street, a two-story frame house (see photo #14 with NRHP nomination)
Parrish-Hutchings-Johnson, on Madison Street, a two-story frame house which once served as a boardinghouse
Mitchell-Smith-Bowen-Blair House (during 1810s), also known as the Judge Bowen House.

It includes the old courthouse square, site of former two-story brick Jones County Courthouse (1818), which was demolished in the 1920s or 1930s.

References

External links

Historic districts on the National Register of Historic Places in Georgia (U.S. state)
Georgian architecture in Georgia (U.S. state)
National Register of Historic Places in Jones County, Georgia